Megacephala asperata is a species of tiger beetle in the subfamily Cicindelinae that was described by C. O. Waterhouse in 1877.

References

asperata
Beetles described in 1877